Crawford, Alabama may refer to the following places in Alabama:
Crawford, Mobile County, Alabama
Crawford, Russell County, Alabama